George Coburn (4 March 1920 – 25 February 2009) was an Irish politician. Coburn was elected to Dáil Éireann as a Fine Gael Teachta Dála (TD) for the Louth constituency at a by-election on 3 March 1954 caused by the death of his father James Coburn. He was re-elected at the 1954 and 1957 general elections. He did not contest the 1961 general election, and instead migrated to England to work as a post office official.

See also
Families in the Oireachtas

References

1920 births
2009 deaths
Fine Gael TDs
Members of the 14th Dáil
Members of the 15th Dáil
Members of the 16th Dáil
Politicians from County Louth
Irish emigrants to the United Kingdom